The Secret of Madame Clapain (French: Le secret de Madame Clapain) is a 1943 French crime film directed by André Berthomieu and starring Raymond Rouleau, Line Noro and Michèle Alfa.

The film's sets were designed by the art director Serge Piménoff.

Cast

References

Bibliography 
 Rège, Philippe. Encyclopedia of French Film Directors, Volume 1. Scarecrow Press, 2009.

External links 
 

1943 films
French crime films
1943 crime films
1940s French-language films
Films directed by André Berthomieu
French black-and-white films
1940s French films